The 1976 Portuguese presidential election was held on 27 June.

With a broad base of support that comprised the center-left and the center-right, Ramalho Eanes won the election on the first round and became the first elected President of Portugal after the Carnation Revolution.

The Portuguese Communist Party presented its own candidate, Octávio Pato, a well known anti-fascist. One of the major responsibles for the military operations during the Carnation Revolution, in 1974, Otelo Saraiva de Carvalho, was also a candidate.

Procedure
Any Portuguese citizen over 35 years old has the opportunity to run for president. In order to do so it is necessary to gather between 7500 and 15000 signatures and submit them to the Portuguese Constitutional Court.

According to the Portuguese Constitution, to be elected, a candidate needs a majority of votes. If no candidate gets this majority there will take place a second round between the two most voted candidates.

Candidates

Official candidates
António Ramalho Eanes, Military officer, Main leader against the Coup of 25 November 1975, former chairman of RTP, supported by the Socialist Party, Social Democratic Party, Democratic and Social Centre and the Portuguese Workers' Communist Party;
José Pinheiro de Azevedo, Navy officer, Prime Minister between 1975-1976, Independent candidate;
Octávio Pato, supported by the Portuguese Communist Party;
Otelo Saraiva de Carvalho, Military officer, Independent candidate supported by the Popular Democratic Union, Movement of Socialist Left, People's Socialist Front and the Revolutionary Party of the Proletariat – Revolutionary Brigades;

Unsuccessful candidacies 
There was also one candidate rejected by the Portuguese Constitutional Court for not complying with the legal requirements:

 Venceslau Pompílio da Cruz;

Campaign period

Party slogans

Candidates' debates

Results

|-
!style="background-color:#E9E9E9" align=left colspan="2" rowspan="2"|Candidates 
!style="background-color:#E9E9E9" align=left rowspan="2"|Supporting parties 	
!style="background-color:#E9E9E9" align=right colspan="2"|First round
|-
!style="background-color:#E9E9E9" align=right|Votes
!style="background-color:#E9E9E9" align=right|%
|-
|style="width: 10px" bgcolor=#ff0081 align="center" | 
|align=left|António Ramalho Eanes
|align=left|Independent 
|align="right" |2,967,137
|align="right" |61.59
|-
|style="width: 8px" bgcolor=#810000 align="center" |
|align=left|Otelo Saraiva de Carvalho
|align=left|Independent 
|align="right" |792,760
|align="right" |16.46
|-
|style="width: 8px" bgcolor=#777777 align="center" | 
|align=left|José Pinheiro de Azevedo
|align=left|Independent
|align="right" |692,147
|align="right" |14.37
|-
|style="width: 8px" bgcolor=red align="center" | 
|align=left|Octávio Rodrigues Pato
|align=left|Portuguese Communist Party
|align="right" |365,586
|align="right" |7.59
|-
|colspan="3" align=left style="background-color:#E9E9E9"|Total valid
|width="65" align="right" style="background-color:#E9E9E9"|4,817,630
|width="40" align="right" style="background-color:#E9E9E9"|100.00
|-
|align=right colspan="3"|Blank ballots
|width="65" align="right" |43,242
|width="40" align="right" |0.89
|-
|align=right colspan="3" |Invalid ballots
|width="65" align="right"|20,253
|width="40" align="right"|0.41
|-
|colspan="3" align=left style="background-color:#E9E9E9"|Total
|width="65" align="right" style="background-color:#E9E9E9"|4,881,125 
|width="40" align="right" style="background-color:#E9E9E9"|
|-
|colspan=3|Registered voters/turnout
||6,467,480||75.47
|-
|colspan=5 align=left|Source: Comissão Nacional de Eleições
|}

Maps

Notes

References

External links
Portuguese Electoral Commission

See also
 President of Portugal
 Portugal
 Politics of Portugal

1976
1976 elections in Portugal
June 1976 events in Europe